Christopher Richards (14 July 1882 – 23 August 1971) was an Australian rules footballer who played with South Melbourne in the Victorian Football League (VFL).

Notes

External links 

1882 births
1971 deaths
Australian rules footballers from Melbourne
Sydney Swans players